Minuscule 84 (in the Gregory-Aland numbering), ε 1219 (Soden), is a Greek minuscule manuscript of the New Testament, on parchment leaves. Palaeographically it has been assigned to the 12th century. It was adapted for liturgical use.

Description 

The codex contains the text of the four Gospel of Matthew and Gospel of Mark with numerous lacunae, on 66 thick parchment leaves (size ). The text is written in one column per page, 19-20 lines per page (size of text ).

There is also a division according to the Ammonian Sections, (no references to the Eusebian Canons).

It contains lectionary markings at the margin (for liturgical use), and incipits before some lectionary pericopas.

 Contents
Matthew 1:18-13:10; 13:27-42; 14:3-18:25; 19:9-21.33; Matthew 22:4—Mark 7:14.

 Text
The Greek text of the codex is a representative of the Byzantine text-type. Aland placed it in Category V.

History 

It was examined by Bengel (as August. 2), Scholz, and Burgon.

Formerly the manuscript was held in Augsburg (as codices 83 and 85). C. R. Gregory saw it in 1887.

It is currently housed in at the Bavarian State Library (Gr. 568), at München.

See also 

 List of New Testament minuscules
 Biblical manuscript
 Textual criticism
 Codex Monacensis

References

Further reading 

 

Greek New Testament minuscules
12th-century biblical manuscripts